Automola rufa is a species of fly in the family Richardiidae.

References

Tephritoidea
Articles created by Qbugbot
Insects described in 1906